Envie is a comune (municipality) in the province of Cuneo, Piedmont, northern Italy, located about  southwest of Turin and about  northwest of Cuneo.
 
Envie borders the following municipalities: Barge, Revello, Rifreddo, Sanfront.

Twin towns
 María Susana, Argentina

References

Cities and towns in Piedmont